The Edward Goodrich Acheson Award was established by The Electrochemical Society (ECS) in 1928 to honor the memory of Edward Goodrich Acheson, a charter member of ECS. The award is presented every 2 years for "conspicuous contribution to the advancement of the objectives, purposes, and activities of the society (ECS)". 

Recipients of the award receive a gold medal, wall plaque, and cash prize, ECS Life membership, and a complimentary meeting registration.

History 
The Edward Goodrich Acheson Award is the first and most prestigious award of The Electrochemical Society. The award was established by a gift of $25,000 from past president (and namesake of the award) Edward Goodrich Acheson. Originally, recipients were presented with a prize of $1,000, a gold medal, and a bronze replica, with the intention that the gold medal would "find its way to the safe deposit box," while the replica was reserved for "everyday use". The Acheson family later agreed to have the medal be electroplated gold in order to keep the award fund in balance. Thanks to continuous donations from the Acheson family between 1942 and 1991, the endowment fund has allowed the monetary prize to be increased 3 times since its establishment.

Recipients of the award

As listed by ECS:

 2018 Tetsuya Osaka
 2016 Barry Miller
 2014 Ralph J. Brodd
 2012 Dennis W. Hess
 2010  John S. Newman
 2008 Robert P. Frankenthal
 2006 Vittorio de Nora
 2004 Wayne L. Worrell
 2002 Bruce Deal
 2000 Larry R. Faulkner
 1998 Jerry M. Woodall
 1996 Richard C. Alkire
 1994 J. Bruce Wagner, Jr.
 1992 Dennis R. Turner
 1990 Theodore R. Beck
 1988 Herbert H. Uhlig
 1986 Eric M. Pell
 1984 Norman Hackerman
 1982 Henry C. Gatos
 1980 Ernest B. Yeager
 1978 Dan A. Vermilyea
 1976 N. Bruce Hannay
 1974 Cecil V. King
 1972 Charles W. Tobias
 1970 Samuel Ruben
 1968 Francis L. LaQue
 1966 Warren C. Vosburgh
 1964 Earl A. Gulbransen
 1962 Charles L. Faust
 1960 Henry B. Linford
 1958 William J. Kroll
 1956 Robert M. Burns
 1954 George W. Heise
 1952 John W. Marden
 1950 George W. Vinal
 1948 Duncan A. MacInnes
 1946 H. Jermain Creighton 
 1944 William Blum
 1942 Charles F. Burgess
 1939 Francis C. Frary
 1937 Frederick M. Becket
 1935 Frank J. Tone
 1933 Colin G. Fink
 1931 Edwin Fitch Northrup
 1929 Edward Goodrich Acheson

See also

 List of chemistry awards

References

External links 

 Edward Goodrich Acheson Award Recipients

American science and technology awards
Chemistry awards
Awards established in 1928